Jazib Qureshi (born 3 August 1940) is an Urdu poet, writer and critic from Pakistan. He has written many poetry books and works of criticism.

Biography

Background

Qureshi was born on 3 August 1940 in Luchnow, India, where he spent his childhood. When he was six, his father died. As a result, he could not study further and worked hard for his living. He migrated with his family to Lahore, Pakistan, in 1950. He gained work in the press. He recommenced his studies and began writing poetry, attending literary gatherings and reading his poetry. His first literary gathering was in the Shahi Qila, chaired by poet Ehsan Danish.

Qureshi was helped to write poetry by Shakir Dehlavi, who belonged to Dagh Dehlavi school of thought. Qureshi moved to Karachi in 1962, he worked in different magazines and newspapers. He qualified for master's degree from University of Karachi. Later he became a teacher in a college. He also made a feature film, "Pathar Kay Sanam", but it failed to gain a public response and experienced a financial loss.

Literary career

Qureshi has written many books. His first work of literary criticism was published in 1982, and he also published poetry and prose books. He is a poet at the literary gatherings.
As a poet and writer he has visited 35 cities across the United States, and he has also visited Bahrain, Qatar, Dubai, Sharjah and Abu Dhabi several times.

Bibliography 

 Takhleeqi Awaz تخلیقی آواز
 Ankh aur Charagh آنکھ اور چراغ
 Shairee aur Tehzeeb شاعری اور تہذیب
 Doosray Kinaray Tuk دوسرے کنارے تک
 Meri TehreeraiN میری تحریریں
 Mein nay Yeh Jana میں نے یہ جانا
 Pehchan پہچان
 Neend ka Reshum نیند کا ریشم
 Sheeshay ka Darakht شیشے کا درخت
 Ashoab e JaN آشوب جاں
 Ujlee AwazaiN اجلی آوازیں
 Shakasta Uks شکستہ عکس
 Shanasaii شناسائی
 Jhernay جھرنے
 AqeedataiN عقیدتیں
 Mujhay Yad Haiمجھے یاد ہے
 Naat kay Jadeed Rung نعت کے جدید رنگ
 Meri Shairee Meri Musavari میری شاعری، میری مصوری

Death
He died on 21 June 2021 in Karachi and buried in Azizabad graveyard.

See also

 List of Pakistani poets
 List of Urdu language poets
 List of Pakistani writers

References

External links
 Literature is losing adherents

1940 births
20th-century Pakistani poets
Urdu-language poets from Pakistan
Living people
Pakistani male poets
20th-century Pakistani male writers
Muhajir people